The 2012 Leap Day tornado outbreak was a significant and deadly tornado outbreak on February 28 and February 29, 2012. It caused severe damage in several regions, especially the Great Plains and Ohio Valley regions. It also resulted in several tornadoes in the Central Plains, a rarity for the time of year. The most destructive and deadly tornado was a violent early-morning EF4 that hit Harrisburg, Illinois, killing 8 people. In total, 15 people died in the outbreak. Just two days later, a larger and deadlier outbreak devastated the Ohio Valley and Southern United States.

Meteorological synopsis
A significant and deadly tornado outbreak began in the Great Plains on February 28, as supercell thunderstorms developed and tornadoes touched down across the region. An EF2 tornado struck the small town of Harveyville, Kansas during the late evening hours, killing one person and injuring 12 others. The town's only church was completely destroyed, several homes received moderate to severe damage, and every building in the small community received a form of damage. As the storms moved into Missouri later that night and into the early morning hours of February 29, numerous strong tornadoes touched down. An EF2 devastated a mobile home park  and killed one person near Buffalo, while an EF3 caused another fatality and destroyed homes near Asherville. By 3:00 am CST on February 29, Branson, Missouri was reporting injuries and severe damage to the town from an EF2 tornado, with homes destroyed and several hotels, businesses, and theaters sustaining severe damage. Three other deaths occurred in southern Missouri.

As the storms moved into Illinois in the pre-dawn hours, they merged into an intense squall line with embedded semi-discrete supercell thunderstorms. A violent EF4 tornado touched down and ripped through the city of Harrisburg, destroying entire neighborhoods, flattening businesses, and killing 8 people before causing additional destruction in the neighboring town of Ridgway. After sunrise, additional supercells developed and produced numerous tornadoes across Kentucky and Tennessee. Two tornadoes, rated EF1 and EF2, caused significant damage in Greenville, Kentucky. The town of Hodgenville, Kentucky also sustained heavy damage from two separate EF2 tornadoes. An EF1 tornado caused a fatality near Smithville, Tennessee, and an EF2 destroyed homes and killed two more people near Crossville before the outbreak came to an end. A total of 42 tornadoes were confirmed, and 15 people were killed.

Confirmed tornadoes

February 28 event

February 29 event

Harrisburg–Ridgway, Illinois

This violent early morning tornado produced devastating damage and fatalities in Harrisburg, Illinois, and caused additional severe damage in the neighboring town of Ridgway shortly before sunrise on February 29, 2012. The Harrisburg/Ridgway tornado was spawned by a semi-discrete supercell thunderstorm embedded within a larger squall line of storms that was racing through southern Illinois at the time. Touching down to the southwest of Carrier Mills at 4:51 a.m. The tornado initially snapped tree limbs at EF0 intensity as it moved to the northeast and clipped the northern edge of town. A church in this area had its steeple bent over and one of its exterior walls bowed out. EF0 damage continued to the north of Ledford, with a home sustaining minor damage in that area. Past Ledford, the tornado strengthened to EF1 intensity as it uprooted large trees and moved through the Liberty community at the southwest edge of Harrisburg, where it caused minor damage to Harrisburg Middle School. The tornado continued to intensify as it entered the southwestern edge of the city at 4:56 a.m., tearing through the Dorrisville neighborhood at EF2 strength, where many homes sustained significant damage and numerous trees were snapped and uprooted. A few small homes were destroyed, and a farm service business in this area sustained heavy damage.

The tornado then rapidly intensified into a violent EF4 as it crossed South Commercial Street, where some businesses were completely leveled with only piles of rubble left behind. Several other businesses were damaged, and the large Christ Lutheran Church was flattened with debris wind-rowed long distances through a nearby field. A paper check from the church was later found in the yard of a residence 45 miles away. Continuing at EF4 strength, the tornado proceeded to level a large strip mall just to the south of the Walmart Supercenter, with large amounts of debris strewn into a nearby retention pond. EF4 damage continued as the tornado devastated the Gaskins City neighborhood. Numerous homes in this area were badly damaged or destroyed, several of which were leveled or swept from their foundations. Seven people were confirmed dead in this area. Most of the fatalities occurred at a small apartment complex along Brady Street, where small one-story apartment buildings were swept away. On June 3 another victim died in the hospital from their injuries, raising the death toll to 8. Vehicles were tossed and destroyed, many trees and power lines were downed, and metal fence posts were bent to the ground in this area as well. Harrisburg Medical Center also sustained major damage as the tornado exited Harrisburg and continued off to the northeast. About 200 homes and about 25 businesses within the city were destroyed or severely damaged, with many other structures being damaged to a lesser degree. In addition to the 8 fatalities, 95 other people were injured, some critically. The following night, a mandatory curfew was in place in the affected areas; 5PM Wednesday afternoon through 7AM Thursday morning. Counting damage and death toll, it was reported to be the worst tornado related disaster in the United States since the Joplin, Missouri tornado of 2011. Harrisburg Unit 3 schools were closed until 5 March 2012 and upon reopening offered trauma counseling to its students. Westboro Baptist Church commented on the event, which prompted locals to create a "shield of support" around the funeral processions with thousands attending, standing in large groups around the city. The Federal Emergency Management Agency (FEMA) and IEMA began doing preliminary damage assessments on 5 March 2012 to determine the need for public assistance from FEMA. The tornado damage in Harrisburg dominated national airwaves for several days with both Anderson Cooper, and Diane Sawyer doing special reports. Both The New York Times and Chicago Tribune wrote articles on the resilient history and nature of Harrisburg in the wake of the tornado and floods that have hit the city since its founding in 1889.

Just northeast of Harrisburg, EF3 tree damage was observed as the tornado crossed Illinois Route 13, with hardwood trees denuded and debarked in this area. An adult bookstore was destroyed at high-end EF2 intensity near this location as well, sustaining loss of its roof and collapse of exterior walls. The tornado continued through very sparsely populated areas of Saline County, traversing open farm fields and debarking several additional hardwood trees at EF3 strength. As the tornado passed to the south of Eldorado, trees were uprooted and another house had significant roof and exterior wall loss, with the damage at that location rated high-end EF2. As the tornado approached the Gallatin County line, a house sustained EF3 damage and was left with only interior rooms standing. The tornado then crossed into Gallatin County, snapping trees and inflicting high-end EF2 damage to another home. The tornado continued northeastward before striking the town of Ridgway, where severe damage occurred. In Ridgway, the tornado damaged about 140 homes and businesses, with considerable damage to some structures in the downtown area. Numerous cars were tossed around, mainly on the east side of town. A factory building was severely damaged, many large trees were snapped and uprooted, power lines were downed, and about a half dozen grain bins were completely destroyed. Most of the damage in Ridgway was within the EF2 range, though a small pocket of low-end EF4 damage occurred where large and well-built brick church was almost entirely leveled with only part of the front wall left standing. No fatalities occurred in Ridgway, though 13 people were injured, one critically. Past Ridgway, the tornado snapped and uprooted trees at EF1 to EF2 strength before dissipating east-northeast of town. The Harrisburg/Ridgway tornado had a total path length of 26.5 miles and was on the ground for 22 minutes.

See also
List of North American tornadoes and tornado outbreaks
Tornado outbreak of Leap Day 1952 – Another destructive tornado outbreak that occurred on a Leap Day and produced a violent F4 tornado
Tornado outbreak of March 2–3, 2012 – A larger and deadlier tornado outbreak that occurred immediately after this one.

References

External links
Time-lapse visualization of the 2012 Leap Day tornado outbreak

Tornadoes of 2012
Tornadoes in Illinois
Tornadoes in Kansas
Tornadoes in Kentucky
Tornadoes in Missouri
Tornadoes in Tennessee
F4 tornadoes by date
Saline County, Illinois
2012 natural disasters in the United States
Leap Day tornado outbreak